The Weeknd is a Canadian singer, songwriter, and record producer who has recorded material for five studio albums, three mixtapes and two extended plays (EP), as well as contribute to other artist's respective albums. He began his recording career in 2009 by anonymously releasing music on YouTube. Two years later, he co-founded the XO record label and released his first three mixtapes House of Balloons, Thursday and Echoes of Silence. He collaborated with different producers, primarily Doc McKinney and Illangelo. The alternative R&B projects were met with widespread acclaim for its dark lyrical content that explored the Weeknd's drug usage and romantic experiences. They were also praised for its diverse musical styles, which incorporated elements of soul, trip hop, hip hop, dream pop, indie rock, downtempo and post-punk.

After signing with Republic Records in 2012, the Weeknd re-released his three mixtapes in the compilation album Trilogy. Preceding the album was the release of his debut single "Wicked Games", an alternative R&B and quiet storm track that he co-wrote with McKinney and Illangelo. Follow-up singles included "Twenty Eight" and "The Zone" featuring Drake. The Weeknd's debut studio album Kiss Land was released in September 2013. It was supported by six singles, including the lead single of the same name and "Belong to the World". Primarily a R&B and dark wave album, the Weeknd worked with new collaborators for Kiss Land such as Belly, DaHeala and DannyBoyStyles.

The Weeknd's second studio album Beauty Behind the Madness was released in August 2015. He reunited with Belly, DaHeala, DannyBoyStyles and Illangelo, and worked with new collaborators such as Max Martin and Kanye West. The album was supported by five singles, including "The Hills", an alternative R&B and trap song that incorporates Amharic lyricism, and "Can't Feel My Face", a pop, disco and funk track. Both singles reached number one on the US Billboard Hot 100. Beauty Behind the Madness featured guest appearances from Ed Sheeran, Labrinth and Lana Del Rey. In November 2016, the Weeknd released Starboy, a R&B, pop and trap record that included the lead single of the same name and "I Feel It Coming", with both singles featuring first-time collaborators Daft Punk. The album featured guest appearances from Kendrick Lamar, Future and Lana Del Rey.

In March 2018, the Weeknd released his first EP My Dear Melancholy, which combined contemporary and alternative R&B with electropop. Primarily produced by Frank Dukes, the EP contained contributions from Guy-Manuel de Homem-Christo, Mike Will Made It, Starrah and Skrillex. It was supported by one single, "Call Out My Name", and featured a guest appearance from Gesaffelstein. In March 2020, the Weeknd released his fourth studio album After Hours, which served as a re-introduction of new wave and dream pop sounds combined with electropop and synth-pop sounds. The album was supported by four singles, including "Heartless" and "Blinding Lights". Both singles reached number one on the Billboard Hot 100, with the latter becoming the second longest-charting single in the chart's history. Lyrically, After Hours contains themes of promiscuity, overindulgence and self-loathing. In January 2022, the Weeknd released his dance-pop inspired fifth studio album Dawn FM.

In addition to his studio work, the Weeknd has recorded songs for film soundtracks, including featuring on Sia's single "Elastic Heart" from The Hunger Games: Catching Fire (2013), "Earned It", a chamber pop and R&B track from Fifty Shades of Grey (2015), and "Pray For Me", a pop-rap track with Kendrick Lamar for Black Panther (2018).

Released songs

References 

The Weeknd songs
Lists of songs recorded by Canadian artists